Jaqueline Marisol Jolón González (born 24 May 1999) is a Guatemalan footballer who plays as a goalkeeper for CSD Municipal and the Guatemala women's national team.

Club career
Jolón has played for CSD Municipal in Guatemala.

International career
Jolón made her senior debut for Guatemala on 16 February 2021 in a 3–1 friendly home win over Panama.

References

1999 births
Living people
Guatemalan women's footballers
Women's association football goalkeepers
C.S.D. Municipal players
Guatemala women's international footballers